Henderson West is a suburb of Honiara, Solomon Islands and is located West Honiara International Airport.

References

Populated places in Guadalcanal Province
Suburbs of Honiara